Peter Kalumba Chishala (October 10, 1957 – June 15, 1995) better known by his stage name P.K. Chishala, was a Zambian musician. He is considered by many, to be one of the greatest musicians of the Kalindula genre. He contributed to the development and popularising the genre. His signature song is "common man", he has also produced several hits i.e "Pole-Pole (church elder)", "Na Musonda" , "Mwaume Walutuku" and so forth.

Life
He was the son of Maxem Chishala and Serah Mutele Kalumba Mwisa. He did his primary education at Mambilima mission school for the blind and later on went to the Western Province at Sefula Secondary School to pursue his Secondary education. In his early years, P.K Chishala struggled with smallpox which later left him blind. He later worked as a social worker at MEF (Mindolo Ecumunical foundation) before his rise on the Zambian musical stage.

Music Career
He debuted with "Icisosa Cipamano", which he recorded at Malachite Studios during his school days. Although it was not a huge success, the song gave an indication of what he was capable of doing.
He followed it up with "Ba Pastor", which took a swipe at the immoral behavior of pastors. Naturally, it did not go down well in religious circles. Some sections of society thought that the song was a true story, but PK refuted that. Some called for it to be banned saying it was blasphemous. But despite the controversy, it went on to win the Song of the Year award in 1985.
He followed it up with the album Church Elder, released under the  Kariba label by Teal Record Company, and whose title-track exposes the misdeeds of one "church elder" by the name of Pole Pole.
The album had other songs like "Impumba Mikowa", a lament from orphans complaining about their plight, and "Mulele", a Luvale song advising a school girl to first complete her education instead of rushing into marriage.
The title-track won PK the 1987 Soloist of the Year Award, and made him the country’s flag bearer at the 1988 World of Music and Dance (WOMAD) Festival, an annual event held in the UK.
He was sponsored by Teal Record and was backed by the Masasu Band.
P.K. Chishala & the Great Pekachi Band was one of the first wave of kalindula music along with Junior Mulemena Boys, and the Masasu Band. 
One of the songs that he performed there, Umuti wa Aids, was featured on the WOMAD compilation album.
After that, he released "Na Musonda", on which he introduced his wife "Harriet" on backing vocals. The album also had the humorous song Kubwaiche.
In 1993, he Released his fourth album Umwaume walutuku. For the song "Common man",the late P.K Chishala was once observed to be against the then President Kenneth Kaunda.
 signature songs include "Common Man" from 
The song was originally composed and performed by Bennet Simbeye.
The album also had the satirical Muchibolya and the danceable Lelo ni Weekend, which is highly popular at weddings.

Discography

Studio albums

Popular Songs
Church elder
Chimbaya mbaya
Na Musonda
Nakufele
Umunadi
Mwaume Walutuku
Common man

References

1957 births
1995 deaths
Zambian musicians